Neall Ellis is a South African military aviator and mercenary. Raised in Bulawayo, he joined the South African Air Force after a brief stint in the Rhodesian Army. As a helicopter pilot he was awarded the Honoris Crux decoration in 1983, and later attained field rank. After retiring from the SAAF he contracted for various private military corporations, including Executive Outcomes and Sandline International. During the civil war in Sierra Leone, he and his Mi-24 crew held off Revolutionary United Front (RUF) forces almost single-handedly. He also provided fire support for British troops during Operation Barras.

References

External links
 https://www.independent.co.uk/news/world/africa/british-officer-advised-gunship-killers-699306.html
 http://www.shadowcompanythemovie.com/about_featured3.html
 http://www.abc.net.au/foreign/content/2000/s229144.htm
 http://www.cracked.com/article_19472_the-5-craziest-soldiers-fortune-to-ever-cash-paycheck.html

Living people
Foreign volunteers in the Rhodesian Security Forces
Helicopter pilots
People from Johannesburg
Rhodesian military personnel of the Bush War
Rhodesian mercenaries
South African aviators
South African emigrants to Rhodesia
South African mercenaries
South African military personnel of the Border War
South African people of Dutch descent
South African people of British descent
University of Natal alumni
1949 births